The Battle of Lapušnik (Serbian:Битка код Лапушника, Albanian: Beteja e Gryka e Llapushnikut) took place in Llapushnik, District of Pristina, 1998 during the Kosovo war. It lasted 3 days and ended in the Kosovo Liberation Army being victorious against the Yugoslav forces. Kadri Veseli a Kosovo Politician and former founder and leader of the Kosovo Liberation Army recalled it as one of the most fierce battles, saying that the dimensions of frontal fighting in Llapushnik resonated throughout Europe and increased the populations confidence in the strength of the Kosovo Liberation Army with a massive mobilisation.

Second Battle 
About 200 Serbian soldiers and policemen set out on July 25, at around 10:00 a.m., to break the KLA stronghold Lapušnik. Given that the KLA were in deep cover, the artillery preparation of the Serbian forces lasted 60 minutes. After that, the infantry launched an attack. The first wave of attacks consisted of members of the police who advanced up to 350 meters from the KLA positions, before they were met with fire. As direct fire support, M53/59 Praga vehicles, a M36 "Jackson" and a T-55 tank were also included. The front positions of the KLA were destroyed by fire from BRDM vehicles.and M53/59 Prague, after which they retreated through dug trenches through the forest to a reserve position. Part of the infantry, about thirty policemen who were walking through the cornfields on the right wing, wedged themselves into the KLA's defense, which was set up in the shape of a horseshoe. In fact, the police were ambushed and the radio systems were called for help.

Sergeant Nenad Vuković with BRDM and one Praga as mobile fire support were sent to help the policemen in the ambush. When they went out on the road, they found themselves under the influence of RBRs and a heavy Broving machine gun, by the KLA. Sergeant Vuković crosses about a hundred meters, opening fire from the movement, enters the cornfield and with a BRDM, from a 14.5 mm machine gun, acts on the cover of the KLA soldiers, enabling the besieged policemen to get out of the ring towards the surrounding houses. BRDM-2 gets stuck while exiting the asphalt road, falling into the canal with its rear wheels, while Praga is about 100 meters behind that vehicle. At least two rockets from RBR Osa were fired at the vehicle, which miss the vehicle, but detonations in the immediate vicinity throw the vehicle onto the road and decapitate it. The crew of the BRDM opened fire and the vehicle was hit by a rocket from the RBR, which did not activate and caused damage. After that, the BRDM-2 maneuvers and takes cover between the houses.

After that, all the vehicles lined up in a battle line and beat the positions of the KLA with all means. After 20 minutes, the firing stoped and the KLA was defeated, the KLA began to fleeing along the railway towards the Berisha mountains. Soon, soldiers and policemen enter the trenches where about 60 KLA soldiers, all of whom were in uniform, died. One KLA soldier who strayed during the fighting was also arrested.

References 

Military operations of the Kosovo War
1998 in Kosovo
1990s battles
Kosovo Liberation Army